The 1937–38 Michigan Wolverines men's basketball team represented the University of Michigan in intercollegiate basketball during the 1937–38 season. The team scored 740 points in 20 games for an average of 37.0 points per game—the second highest point total and scoring per game in school history.  Despite prolific scoring for the era, Michigan finished in a tie for fifth in the Big Ten Conference.  The team compiled a 9–1 record in the first half of the season, including a six-game winning streak at the start of the season.  However, the team went 3–7 in the second half of the season for a season record of 12–8, and 6–6 against Big Ten opponents.

One of the highlights of the season was a tour of the east during the winter break.  Michigan played and defeated Maryland, Rochester, and a highly touted Dartmouth team on the trip.  The Wolverines held Dartmouth to one point in the first half and led 21–1 at halftime.  While the second half of the season was a disappointment, the Wolverines had scored their highest single game total in a 58–29 over Wisconsin on February 21, 1938.

Franklin "Cappy" Cappon was in his seventh and final year as the team's coach.  Cappon had played basketball and football at Michigan from 1919 to 1923.  As a senior, he was awarded the Western Conference Medal for all-around excellence in both athletics and academics.  After seven seasons as Michigan's head coach, Cappon served as the head basketball coach from 1938 to 1961 at Princeton University, where he mentored Butch van Breda Kolff, Bill Bradley and Frank Deford. He compiled a combined record of 340–242 at Michigan and Princeton and was inducted into the Helms Foundation College Basketball Hall of Fame in 1957.

John "Jake" Townsend, a six-foot, four inch center from Indiana, was the team captain and leading scorer.  Townsend was the team's leading scorer for three straight seasons.  He scored 154 points during the 1935–36 season, 191 points during the 1936–37 season, and 226 points (81 field goals and 64 of 91 free throws) in 20 games as a senior during the 1937–38 season.  Townsend 226 points during the 1937–38 season broke the school's single season scoring record of 181 points set by Arthur Karpus in the 1918–19 season.  His career total of 571 points also broke Karpus's career scoring record of 338 points.  Townsend was selected as a consensus All-American the end of the 1937–38 season.  Townsend later played professional basketball in the National Basketball League for the Indianapolis Kautskys, Oshkosh All-Stars and Rochester Royals.

On March 8, 1938, the day after the season's final game, Coach Cappon announced that he had accepted the head coaching job at Princeton.

Schedule

Scoring statistics

Coaching staff
Franklin Cappon - coach
Fielding H. Yost - athletic director

References

Michigan
Michigan Wolverines men's basketball seasons
Michigan Wolverines basketball
Michigan Wolverines basketball